This is a list of Members of Parliament (MPs) elected to the Assembly of the Republic for the 3rd Parliament of the Turkish Republic of Northern Cyprus at the 1993 parliamentary election, which was held on 12 December 1993.

The list below indicates the MPs in the parties in which they were elected.

Lefkoşa

Gazimağusa

Girne

References 

Members of the Assembly of the Republic (Northern Cyprus)